This page includes a list of Sarah Brightman's awards and certifications.

Awards

1990s
 1986	Grammy Nomination, Best Classical Artist, United States
 1996	Echo Award nomination: Best Female Artist, Germany
 1996	RSH Gold: Best Female Artist, Germany
 1997	Echo Award nomination: Best Female Artist
 1998	Echo Award: Best Song Time To Say Goodbye
 1998	Golden Lion Award: Best Live Performance, Germany
 1998	Goldene Europa Award: Best Female Artist, Germany
 1998	Guinness Book Entry: Germany's Best-Selling Single of All Time Time to Say Goodbye
 1998	Grammy Taiwan: Best Selling Record Timeless
 1998	Unesco Hand-in-Hand Award
 1999	Czechoslovakian Grammy: Singer of the Year
 1999	Echo Award nomination: Best Female Artist, Germany
 1999	The Point Trophy, Dublin-Ireland: Highest-Grossing Ticket Sales One Night in Eden

2000s
 2000	IFPI Award, Europe: Album sales exceeding one million copies in Europe Timeless
 2001	New Age Voice Music Award, United States: Best Vocal Album
 2003	Media Control Award, GAS: Biggest Hit of All Time Time To Say Goodbye
 2004	Arabian Music Award: Best Collaboration (“The War Is Over” with Kazim Al Saher)
 2004	Arabian Music Award: Best Female Artist
 2005	New York Film Festival: First Prize, Music Documentary (A Desert Fantasy)
 2005	New York Film Festival: Third Prize, Music Video Time to Say Goodbye
 2007  The 21st Japan Gold Disc Award 2007: Classic Album of the Year Diva: The Singles Collection
 2009  The 23rd Japan Gold Disc Award 2009: Classic Album of the Year A Winter Symphony
 2009  The 24th Japan Gold Disc Award 2010: Classic Album of the Year Amalfi - Sarah Brightman Love Songs
 2009 Mexico's Lunas del Auditorio nomination: Best Pop-album in foreign language Symphony: Live in Vienna

2010s
 2010 Mexico's Lunas del Auditorio nomination: Best Pop-artist in foreign language
 2013 6th annual Shorty Award nomination: Social Media best Singer

2020s
 2022 Star on the Hollywood Walk of Fame under the category of live performance

Certifications

Americas

Canada Platinum x 8, Gold x 2
United States Platinum x 5, Gold x 6
Mexico Platinum x 1, Gold x 6
Brazil Gold x 7
Chile Gold
Venezuela Gold
Argentina - Platinum x 6, Gold x 2 
Colombia - Gold

Europe

Germany Platinum x 6, Gold x 4
Denmark Platinum x 3, Gold x 2
Norway Platinum x 3, Gold x 1
Sweden Platinum x 3, Gold x 2
Finland Gold x 2
UK Gold x 2, Silver
Ireland Platinum x 4, Gold x 2
Portugal Platinum, Gold x 3
Austria Platinum x 2
Switzerland Platinum x 2
Netherlands Platinum, Gold
Belgium Gold
France Gold
Estonia Gold x 2
Czech Republic Gold
Hungary Gold
Greece Gold x 2
Turkey Gold

Middle East

Israel Platinum x2, Gold x 2
Arabia Gold x 2

Asia

Japan Platinum x 3, Gold x 7
China Platinum x 2, Gold x 4
Hong Kong Platinum x 2, Gold x 6
Singapore Platinum x 6, Gold x 2
Taiwan Platinum x 12, Gold
Malaysia Platinum
South Korea Platinum x 4, Gold x 5

Africa

South Africa Platinum, Gold x 3

Pacific
Australia Platinum x 6, Gold x 4
New Zealand Platinum x 5, Gold x 2

Other Awards
Golden Key to the city of Chicago
Golden Key to the city of Istanbul

References

External links

Awards
Brightman, Sarah